A referendum on the order law was held in Luxembourg on 6 June 1937. Voters were asked whether they approved of the new law (loi d'ordre), which would have banned any political party that sought to change the constitution or national legislation by violence or threats. The law would have resulted in the dissolution of the Communist Party, and became known as the Maulkuerfgesetz ("muzzle law" or loi muselière).

The proposal was narrowly rejected by voters, leading to the resignation of Prime Minister Joseph Bech and his replacement by Pierre Dupong.

Background
The law was proposed by the Party of the Right, which had become increasingly authoritarian during the 1930s. Protests against the law were led by the Labour Party, trade unions and young members of the Radical Liberal Party. Believing he had the support of the majority of the public, Bech agreed to a referendum on the law shortly before it was adopted by the Chamber of Deputies by a vote of 34 to 19.

Results

References

Freedom of association
Referendums in Luxembourg
1937 referendums
1937 in Luxembourg
Constitution of Luxembourg
History of Luxembourg (1890–1945)
June 1937 events